The Orto Botanico di Villa Beuca (34,000 m²) is a botanical garden situated in Beuca, on a terrace nearly 100 meters above the sea located around the Villa Beuca not far from the slopes of the Regional Natural Park of Beigua, in Cogoleto, Province of Genoa, Liguria, Italy. The garden is currently open to the public by appointment on Saturday: for groups and schools, guided tours may be organized; an admission fee is charged.

The garden is divided into 
  a didactic sector (Cornice Didattica) dedicated mainly to exotic species; 
  the Ligurian habitat sector (11,000 m²) which is dedicated to the regional flora and vegetation including also the traditional agricultural landscape with its variety of vines and olives; it presents a set of Ligurian environments among which marine cliff, Mediterranean scrub, thermophilic woodlands, mesophilic woodlands, cultivated areas and wetlands
  a  third area is distributed on a broad slope of natural vegetation (the Cornice spontanea), mainly shrubs, left unchanged.

Exhibits
The Orto Botanico di Villa Beuca hosts a variety of plants from Liguria and around the world, including: 
 
  Castanea sativa
  Quercus ilex
  Quercus pubescens
  Ruscus aculeatus
  Smilax aspera
  Viburnum tinus as well as Calluna vulgaris
  Convolvulus sabatius
  Cytisus scoparius
  Euphorbia spinosa subsp. ligustica
  Helichrysum italicum
  Hypericum perforatum
  Juniperus communis
  Narcissus pseudonarcissus
  Saponaria ocymoides
  Satureja montana
  Thymus pulegioides
  Ziziphus jujuba  and Artemisia absinthium
  Borago officinalis
  Chelidonium majus
  Foeniculum vulgare
  Lavandula angustifolia
  Melissa officinalis
  Origanum vulgare
  Rosmarinus officinalis

See also 
 List of botanical gardens in Italy

References 
 Orto Botanico di Villa Beuca - Official website (Italian, with summary in English)
 Mariotti Mauro, Il fiore della diversità. L'orto botanico di villa Beuca a Cogoleto, ERGA, 2001. .
 Parco Naturale Regionale del Beigua
 Il Giornale article, November 1, 2007 (Italian)
 Cogoleto article (Italian)
 Residence Villa Beuca

Botanical gardens in Italy
Gardens in Liguria
Buildings and structures in the Province of Genoa
Metropolitan City of Genoa